Zac Sapsford is an Australian professional footballer who plays as a striker for Western Sydney Wanderers. He made his A-League Men debut against Brisbane Roar on 22 October 2022 coming off the bench in a 1-1 draw.

Personal life

Sapsford is Jewish and played youth football for Hakoah Sydney City East as well as for English side Chester. He attended Reddam House.

References

External links

Living people
Australian soccer players
Association football midfielders
Western Sydney Wanderers FC players
National Premier Leagues players
A-League Men players
2002 births
Jewish footballers
Jewish Australian sportspeople